Usha Sinha is a leader of Janata Dal (United) who served as the member of the Bihar Legislative Assembly for Hilsa from 2010 to 2015. She is an accused in Bihar topper scam. In June 2016 a Patna court issued arrest warrant against her and her husband in connection with the scam.

References

Bihar MLAs 2010–2015
Janata Dal (United) politicians
Women members of the Bihar Legislative Assembly
People from Nalanda district
Living people
Crime in Bihar
Indian prisoners and detainees
21st-century Indian women politicians
21st-century Indian politicians
Year of birth missing (living people)